Elcano & Magellan: The First Voyage Around the World is a 2019 Spanish computer-animated adventure film directed by Ángel Alonso and written by José Antonio Vitoria and Garbiñe Losana. The film retells the story of 1519 circumnavigation led by Portuguese explorer Ferdinand Magellan and Spanish navigator Juan Sebastián Elcano.

Elcano & Magellan: The First Voyage Around the World premiered at the 2019 Málaga Film Festival on 23 March 2019, and was released in Spain on July 5, during the 500th anniversary of the expedition. The film was made controversial in the Philippines for its inaccurate portrayal of the Filipino natives, especially Lapulapu, who led the Battle of Mactan that killed Magellan. At the 34th Goya Awards, it earned a nomination for Best Animated Film.

The OST "Confía en el Viento" was sung by La Oreja De Van Gogh.

Plot
Set in Seville, Andalusia in 1519, Juan Sebastián Elcano is a young and irresponsible man who wants to live as a captain of his little boat, but due to debts he has with the city's bank, the bank manager confiscates Elcano's boat and orders the guards to arrest him as a defaulter. As he tries to avoid imprisonment, Elcano enlists as part of an expedition of five ships commanded by Portuguese explorer Ferdinand Magellan, nicknamed "The Navigator", in order to arrive in the Moluccas Islands to get spices, very valuable to the ruling Kingdom of Castile. Portuguese ambassador Álvaro da Costa plots to make the journey a failure since the Moluccas Islands belong to the Kingdom of Portugal, and hires Yago as spy and saboteur to prevent the journey's success. Unaware of it, Magellan completes the crew of the five ships: the Trinidad, the San Antonio, the Concepción, the Santiago, and the Victoria; and starts the journey. Elcano, hoping to have his own ship, works as a helmsman for Captain Juan de Cartagena, who despises him and is suspicious about Magellan, taking him as a traitor who secretly works for Portugal. At the same time that Yago makes some sabotages, Cartagena conspires with the other captains to get Magellan's secret map to navigate by unknown lands. But after Magellan died after a battle with natives of the Saint Lazarus islands, Elcano is promoted by the crew as the new leader of the trip. Traveling to the west following the sun and determined to fulfill the mission, Elcano finds himself fighting against not only Yago and da Costa, but time and starvation to make history and give the first trip around the world.

Voice cast

Release
The film was screened on 23 March 2019 during the Málaga Film Festival. It was later released in Spain by Barton Films and Filmax on 5 July 2019, on the 500th anniversary of the circumnavigation. The film was also released in countries such as Kuwait, Lebanon, Poland, Portugal, Russia, Turkey, and Vietnam.

Controversy
In November 2019, the film sparked online controversy in the Philippines for glorifying colonialism and its historical inaccuracies, including the clothes worn by the indigenous Filipino natives in the film and its antagonistic portrayal of Lapulapu and the natives, despite Filipino historians challenging Lapulapu's role in the Battle of Mactan as being only the chieftain and not the one who actually killed Magellan. Some Twitter users also pointed out the similarities of the characters' designs to those of the 2000 American animated film The Road to El Dorado.

An online petition was set on Change.org, calling for the movie to be banned for release in the Philippines. The petition garnered more than 4,000 signatures in its first hours. Agusan del Norte's First District Representative Lawrence Fortun called for the film to be reviewed by both historians and the Movie and Television Review and Classification Board before it could be released in Philippine cinemas.

Despite the criticism the film received on social media, the National Historical Commission of the Philippines stated that, while the commission does not endorse or critique films or any other art form in particular, the film is an opportunity for the Filipino public to learn more about their ancestors, noting that both Spain and the Philippines have biases towards the Magellan-Elcano expedition. In a statement, the commission's chairperson Rene Escalante said:

In response to the calls for the film's ban, Filipino historian Xiao Chua stated that the producers should be allowed to exhibit the film without suffering from censorship. The Malacañang Palace said that it is up to the Movie and Television Review and Classification Board to decide if the film should be either edited or banned in the Philippines.

In response to the film's online backlash, the film's Philippine distributor, Crystal Sky Multimedia, stated that it invited historians, members of the academe and film experts to "re-evaluate" the film.

Accolades

See also 
 List of Spanish films of 2019

References

External links

2019 films
2019 animated films
Cultural depictions of Ferdinand Magellan
Cultural depictions of Filipino men
Films set in Cebu
Films set in Spain
Films set in the 16th century
Films set in the Philippines
Spanish animated films
Spanish historical films
Cartoon controversies
2010s Spanish films
Obscenity controversies in film
Film controversies in the Philippines